Pycnodus (from  , 'dense' and   'tooth') is an extinct genus of ray-finned fish from the Eocene period. It is wastebasket taxon, although many fossils from Jurassic or Cretaceous are assigned to this genus, only Eocene species, P. apodus is valid. As its name suggests, it is the type genus of Pycnodontiformes.
 
The animals, as typical of all other pycnodontids, had many knob-like teeth, forming pavements in the jaws with which to break and crush hard food substances, probably mollusks and echinoderms. These teeth are the most common form of fossil.

Valid species of Pycnodus is only known from Monte Bolca Lagerstätte in Italy, however fossils that were assigned to Pycnodus have been found in present-day India, North Africa, Belgium, England, regions corresponding with the Tethys Ocean. A specimen of the prehistoric whale, Basilosaurus isis,  was found in the Eocene-aged Wadi El Hitan with stomach contents of its last meals, including a large specimen of the species P. mokattamensis along with skeletons of a smaller whale called Dorudon.

References

Pycnodontiformes genera
Eocene fish
Bathonian genus first appearances
Lutetian genus extinctions
Paleogene fish of Europe
Taxa named by Louis Agassiz